Pierre-Simon Laplace was a French mathematician and astronomer.

Laplace, LaPlace or La Place may also refer to:

Places
 Laplace Island (Antarctica)
 La Place, Illinois
 LaPlace, Louisiana
 Promontorium Laplace, a place on the Moon
 4628 Laplace, an asteroid

Fictional locations
 Laplace, a space colony destroyed at the beginning of Mobile Suit Gundam Unicorn

People
 La Placa (surname)

People with the surname
 Charles Laplace (died 2008), West Indian murderer
 Cyrille Pierre Théodore Laplace (1793–1875), French navigator
 Victor Laplace (born 1943), Argentine actor

Transportation, transport stations, vehicles
 Laplace (Paris Metro), a Paris Metro station
 French ship Laplace (A 793), a hydrographic survey ship of the French Navy

Spaceflight
 EJSM/Laplace, a proposed European space mission; precursor to JUICE
 Laplace-P, a proposed Russian space mission

Other uses
 La Place (band), a French band
 LAPLACE (laboratory), a French physics laboratory
 La Place (restaurant chain)
 Lapras, a  fictional species in the Pokémon franchise, called "Laplace" in Japanese

See also

 Laplace distribution, a probability distribution
 Laplace operator, a differential operator equal to the divergence of the gradient of a function
 Laplace pressure, a pressure difference between the inside and the outside of a curved surface
 Laplace transform, integral transform
 Laplace's equation, an elliptic partial differential equation
 Laplacian matrix, matrix representation in graph theory
 
 
 
 
 
 Place (disambiguation)
 LA (disambiguation)

French toponymic surnames